Plakortis edwardsi is a species of sea sponge in the order Homosclerophorida, first found in vertical walls of reef caves at depths of about  in the Caribbean Sea. This species has diods of a single category, with thick and S-shaped centres (measuring 110 to 128μm long); triods which are T-shaped (actines measuring 28–59μm long). It is the only species of this genus exhibiting small diods (measuring 22–31μm long).

References

Further reading
Willenz, P. "Five new species of Homoscleromorpha (Porifera) from the Caribbean Sea and re-description of Plakina jamaicensis." Journal of the Marine Biological Association of the United Kingdom 2 (2014).
Domingos, Celso, Anaíra Lage, and Guilherme Muricy. "Overview of the biodiversity and distribution of the Class Homoscleromorpha in the Tropical Western Atlantic." Journal of the Marine Biological Association of the United Kingdom: 1-11.
Cruz‐Barraza, José Antonio, Cristina Vega, and José Luis Carballo. "Taxonomy of family Plakinidae (Porifera: Homoscleromorpha) from eastern Pacific coral reefs, through morphology and cox1 and cob mtDNA data." Zoological Journal of the Linnean Society 171.2 (2014): 254–276.

External links

WORMS

Homoscleromorpha
Animals described in 2014